Edale is a civil parish in the High Peak district of Derbyshire, England.  The parish contains 28 listed buildings that are recorded in the National Heritage List for England.  All the listed buildings are designated at Grade II, the lowest of the three grades, which is applied to "buildings of national importance and special interest".  The parish is almost entirely rural, consisting of countryside and moorland, and containing small settlements including Grindsbrook Booth and Barber Booth.  Most of the listed buildings are houses, cottages, farmhouses and farm buildings.  The other listed buildings include a church, a chapel, a public house, a sundial, two packhorse bridges, a former cotton mill, a war memorial, and a telephone kiosk.


Buildings

References

Citations

Sources

 

Lists of listed buildings in Derbyshire